The nuclear receptor coactivator 1 (NCOA1) is a transcriptional coregulatory protein that contains several nuclear receptor interacting domains and an intrinsic histone acetyltransferase activity. NCOA1 is recruited to DNA promotion sites by ligand-activated nuclear receptors.  NCOA1, in turn, acylates histones, which makes downstream DNA more accessible to transcription.  Hence, NCOA1 assists nuclear receptors in the upregulation of DNA expression.

NCOA1 is also frequently called steroid receptor coactivator-1 (SRC-1).

Interactions 
Nuclear receptor coactivator 1 possesses a basic helix-loop-helix (bHLH) domain and has been shown to interact with:

 Androgen receptor, 
 C-Fos, 
 C-jun,
 CIITA, 
 CREB-binding protein, 
 Cyclin D1, 
 DDX17, 
 DDX5 and 
 Estrogen receptor alpha, 
 Glucocorticoid receptor, 
 NFKB1, 
 PCAF, 
 PPARGC1A, 
 Peroxisome proliferator-activated receptor alpha, 
 SNW1, 
 STAT3, 
 STAT6, 
 TRIP4,  and
 Thyroid hormone receptor beta.

References

External links

Further reading 

 

Transcription coregulators
PAS-domain-containing proteins